Moody Motorcycle is an album by Human Highway. It was mastered by Fedge. The album's photography was done by Jaime Hogge. It was released on CD as well as root-beer brown Vinyl.

The album contains recordings of songs created by singer-songwriter Jim Guthrie and Nicholas Thorburn, backed up by Evan Gordon, Geordie Gordon and Aaron Harris from the band Islands. The album was recorded at Guthrie's apartment in one week. Patrice Agbokou played bass on the song "My Beach".

Track listing
"The Sound"  – 2:44 (music: Guthrie/Thorburn, lyrics Guthrie, Thorburn)
"All Day"  – 3:32 (music: Guthrie, lyrics Guthrie/Thorburn)
"Get Lost"  – 3:52 (music: Thorburn, lyrics: Thorburn)
"What World"  – 3:33 (music: Guthrie, lyrics Guthrie/Thorburn)
"Sleep Talking"  – 3:34 (music: Thorburn, lyrics: Thorburn)
"Moody Motorcycle"  – 3:11 (music: Guthrie, lyrics Guthrie/Thorburn)
"My Beach"  – 2:55 (music: Thorburn, lyrics: Thorburn)
"Ode to Abner"  – 1:59 (music: Thorburn, lyrics: Thorburn)
"Pretty Hair"  – 3:46 (music: Thorburn, lyrics: Thorburn)
"Vision Failing"  – 3:16 (music: Thorburn, lyrics: Thorburn)
"Duties of a Lighthouse Keeper (music: Guthrie, lyrics Guthrie/Thorburn)"  – 3:51
"I Wish I Knew" (music/lyrics: Dallas, Taylor)  – 3:04

Reception
Slant magazine describes the album as "breezy harmonies" with "acoustic balladeering". while Pop Matters praised the  album's pop-influenced catchy melodies. The album was also reviewed by Tiny Mixtapes, Toronto Star and the North Adams Transcript The reviews were generally fairly positive.

References

External links
SuicideSqueeze.net

Suicide Squeeze Records albums
2008 albums
Human Highway (band) albums